Cora may refer to:

Science
 Cora (fungus), a genus of lichens
 Cora (damselfly), a genus of damselflies
 CorA metal ion transporter, a Mg2+ influx system

People
 Cora (name), a given name and surname
 Cora E. (born 1968), German hip-hop artist
 Sexy Cora or Carolin Ebert (1987–2011), German actress, model, singer

Places

United States
 Cora, Illinois
 Cora, Kansas
 Cora, Missouri
 Cora, West Virginia
 Cora, Washington
 Cora, Wyoming

Other places
 Cora (Ancient Latin town), an ancient town in Latium (Italy)
 Cori, Lazio, Italy

Other uses
 504 Cora, a metallic asteroid from the middle region of the asteroid belt
 Cora (hypermarket), a retail group of hypermarkets in Europe
 Cora (instrument), an alternative spelling of the West African musical instrument Kora
 Cora (opera), a 1791 opera by Étienne Méhul, libretto by Valadier
 Cora (restaurant), a Canadian chain of casual restaurants
 Cora (rocket), a French rocket
 Cora (1812 ship), a brig that was wrecked in 1821
 CORA dataset, free global oceanographic temperature and salinity dataset
 Cora people, an indigenous ethnic group of Western Central Mexico
 Cora language
 The Cora branch of the Huchiti, people in Baja California
 CORA, a typesetting language from Mergenthaler Linotype Company
 Tropical Storm Cora (disambiguation)
 Cora (film), a 1915 American silent drama film
 Cora by Wisk autonomous personal air vehicle

See also
 Cora-cora, large outrigger warships from the Philippines
 Coras (disambiguation)
 Kora (disambiguation)
 Tropical Storm Cora, a list of storms